This is a list of notable events relating to the environment in 1985. They relate to environmental law, conservation, environmentalism and environmental issues.

Events
The K5 Plan, also known as Bamboo Curtain, was an attempt between 1985 and 1989 by the government of the People's Republic of Kampuchea to seal Khmer Rouge guerrilla infiltration routes along virtually the entire Thai-Cambodian border. It had severe environmental effects.
The Vienna Conference was held. It was the first international conference on ozone layer depletion.

April
egg

July
The sinking of the Rainbow Warrior occurred in New Zealand. It was committed by French government DGSE agents to prevent it from taking part in protests over nuclear testing at Moruroa.

See also

Human impact on the environment